The 1938 International Cross Country Championships was held in Belfast, Northern Ireland, at the Royal Ulster Showground on 2 April 1938.  In addition, an unofficial women's championship was held three weeks earlier in Lille, France, on 12 March 1938.   A report on the men's event was given in the Glasgow Herald.

Complete results for men, and for women (unofficial), medallists, and the results of British athletes were published.

Medallists

Individual Race Results

Men's (9 mi / 14.5 km)

Women's (1.9 mi / 3.0 km)

Team Results

Men's

Women's

Participation

Men's
An unofficial count yields the participation of 63 male athletes from 7 countries.

 (9)
 (9)
 (9)
 (9)
 (9)
 (9)
 (9)

Women's
An unofficial count yields the participation of 18 female athletes from 3 countries.

 (6)
 (6)
 (6)

See also
 1938 in athletics (track and field)

References

International Cross Country Championships
International Cross Country Championships
Cross
1938 in Northern Ireland sport
Cross country running in the United Kingdom
Sports competitions in Belfast
20th century in Belfast
Cross country running in France
International Cross Country Championships
International Cross Country Championships
Sport in Lille